Kerwood may refer to:

 USS Kerwood (ID-1489), a United States Navy cargo ship in commission from 1918 to 1919
 Kerwood, a community in Adelaide Metcalfe, Ontario, Canada
 Charlotte Kerwood (born 1986), British sports shooter